Sweetness in the Belly is a 2019 drama film directed by Zeresenay Berhane Mehari, based on the novel of the same name by Camilla Gibb.

It had its world premiere at the 2019 Toronto International Film Festival.

Plot
In the 1960s, Lilly, a British girl, is raised as a Muslim at a Sufi shrine in Morocco after being abandoned there by her parents. As a young woman in the early 1970s, she is sent to Harar, Ethiopia, where she falls in love with a doctor named Aziz, but they are separated when the Ethiopian Civil War begins.

Lilly escapes as a refugee to England. There she befriends Amina, a traumatized fellow refugee who moves in with her. Lilly works as a nurse's aide at a hospital, where a kind doctor named Robin befriends her, but she resists his romantic interest as she hopes to be reunited with Aziz. She and Amina found an association to aid fellow refugees in reunifying their scattered families.

Amina and her two children are reunited with her husband, who has been in an Ethiopian prison, and they move to Canada, but Lilly is shattered to learn that Aziz was executed. Robin helps her recover and she shares her story with him, telling him that she had been told her parents died of drugs.

Cast
Dakota Fanning as Lilly Abdal
Wunmi Mosaku as Amina
Kunal Nayyar as Dr. Robin Sathi
Yahya Abdul-Mateen II as Aziz Abdul Nasser
Estad Tewfik Yusuf Mohamed as The Great Abdel
Edelework Tassew as Gishta
Zeritu Kebede as Nouria
Yafet Henock as Mersha
Rafael Goncalves as Ahmed
Molly McCann as Lilly Mitchell 7 yrs
Gavin Drea as Phillip

Production
In January 2017, it was announced Saoirse Ronan had joined the cast of the film, with Zeresenay Berhane Mehari directing from a screenplay by Laura Phillips, based upon the novel of the same name by Camilla Gibb. In November 2018, it was announced Dakota Fanning, Yahya Abdul-Mateen II, Wunmi Mosaku and Kunal Nayyar joined the cast of the film, with Fanning replacing Ronan.

Principal photography began in November 2018, in Dublin. Production on the film also took place in Harar.

Release
The film had its world premiere at the Toronto International Film Festival on September 7, 2019. In April 2020, Gravitas Ventures acquired U.S. distribution rights to the film, and set it for a May 8, 2020, release. Entertainment One will distribute in Canada.

Reception

Trivia
The film received backlash for Dakota Fanning portraying the lead role in the film. Amid the whitewashing allegations, Fanning took to social media to share more details about her character. "Just to clarify. In the new film I'm part of, Sweetness in the Belly, I do not play an Ethiopian woman," the 25-year-old actress wrote in a message on her Instagram Story. "I play a British woman abandoned by her parents at seven years old in Africa and raised Muslim."

References

External links

2019 films
Films set in London
Films shot in Ethiopia
Films shot in Ireland
English-language Irish films
Irish drama films
English-language Canadian films
Canadian drama films
HanWay Films films
Entertainment One films
Screen Ireland films
Race-related controversies in film
Casting controversies in film
2010s English-language films
2010s Canadian films